Mayzer Alexandre (born 29 June 1984) is an Angolan basketball player.

He is currently playing for ASA at the Angolan major basketball league BAI Basket.

References

External links 
  AfricaBasket Profile

1984 births
Living people
Basketball players from Luanda
Angolan men's basketball players
Small forwards
Atlético Sport Aviação basketball players
C.D. Primeiro de Agosto men's basketball players
C.R.D. Libolo basketball players
African Games gold medalists for Angola
African Games medalists in basketball
Competitors at the 2007 All-Africa Games